The Kennedy Center American College Theater Festival (KCACTF) is a national theatre program dedicated to the improvement of collegiate theatre in the United States.  Focused on the celebration of diverse and exciting theatre, KCACTF involves students from more than 600 colleges and universities throughout the United States.

Overview 
While the culmination of the KCACTF is the national festival held in Washington, D.C. at the Kennedy Center, the majority of students involved in the program compete in one of eight regional competitions.  Over 18,000 students are involved in at least one aspect of KCACTF.

Although the national festival is intended to be the pinnacle of the collegiate theatre year and not necessarily a competition, there are a number of scholarships and awards presented throughout the week, including the Irene Ryan Acting Scholarships. Other competitions include playwriting, directing, set design, costume design, lighting design, sound design, and the Eugene O'Neill Theatre critic's institute and dramaturgy awards, including the David Mark Cohen National Playwriting Award.

Regions 
KCACTF has divided up the United States in 8 separate regions. There are:

National Committee Personnel 
 Gregg Henry - Co-Manager, Artistic Director
 Susan Shaffer - Co-Manager, Administration
 Mark Kuntz - National Chair
 Dr. Harry Parker - National Vice-Chair
 Karen Anselm - Member at Large
 Mark Charney - National Coordinator for the Critic's Institute
 Michael Dempsey - National Theatrical Design Chair
 Catherine Norgren - ATHE Liaison
 John Uthoff - USITT Representative
 Kate Snodgrass - National Chair of Michael Kanin New Plays Program
 Roger Hall - National Vice Chair of NPP
 Gary Garrison - NPP Member at Large

National Award Winners (Productions) 

Previous Award Recipients
Production Awards
The productions below have been recognized for their outstanding achievement. Additionally, the "nominees" for each category have been recognized for distinguished achievement.

Outstanding Production of a Play
2014 - Pentecost by David Edgar, Middlebury College
2013 - Vincent In Brixton by Nicholas Wright, Utah Valley University
2012 - Six Characters adapted from Luigi Pirandello's Six Characters in Search of an Author, Iowa State University.

Outstanding Production of a Musical
2014 - Next to Normal book and lyrics by Brian Yorkey and music by Tom Kitt, Utah Valley University
2013 - Godspell, music and lyrics by Stephen Schwartz, book by John-Michael Tebelak, California State University, Fullerton
2012 - Flipside: The Patti Page Story by Greg White, University of Central Oklahoma.

Outstanding Production of a New Work
2014 - Decision Height by Meredith Levy, Hollins University
2013 - Platero y Yo by Juan Ramon Jimenez, adapted for the stage by Maria Eugenia Mercado and Julia Thompson, University of Puerto Rico
2012 - The Circus in Winter, music and lyrics by Ben Clark, book by the students of the Virginia B. Ball Center for Creative Inquiry, 
inspired by the novel by Cathy Day, Ball State University.

Outstanding Production of a Devised Work
2014 - Pool '63 by Philip Valle and members of the Company, Cuesta College
2013 - Dromnium, University of Arkansas, Fort Smith
2012 - Re-membering Antigone, Long Island University, C.W. Post Campus.

Outstanding Production of a Modern Classic
2013 - Mother Courage, Illinois State University
2012 - Re-membering Antigone, Long Island University, C.W. Post Campus.

National Award Winners (Directing) 

The individuals below have been recognized for their direction of plays, musicals, classic and devised works, and new plays and musicals. Additionally, the "nominees" for each category; those individual artists under consideration, have been recognized for distinguished achievement.

Outstanding Career Achievement in Directing
2012 - John David Lutz, Master Harold and the Boys, University of Evansville.
This production marked John David Lutz's 24th production showcased at Regional Festivals since 1971. Six of these productions were additionally showcased at the National Festival at the Kennedy Center. In 2007, by special invitation, his University of Evansville production of Shakespeare's The Comedy of Errors was one of the Kennedy Center's contributions to the "Shakespeare in Washington" celebration.

Outstanding Director of a Play
2014 - Richard Romagnoli and Cheryl Faraone for Pentecost, Middlebury College
2013 - Christopher Clark for Vincent In Brixton by Nicholas Wright, Utah Valley University
2012 - Matt Foss for Six Characters, adapted from Luigi Pirandello, Iowa State University.

Outstanding Director of a Classic
2012 - Maria Porter for Re-membering Antigone, Long Island University, C.W. Post Campus.

Outstanding Director of a Musical
2014 - David Tinney, Next to Normal, Utah Valley University
2013 - Jim Taulli and Craig Tyrl for Godspell, California State University, Fullerton.
2012 - Greg White for Flipside: The Patti Page Story, University of Central Oklahoma.

Outstanding Lead Deviser/Director of a Devised Work
2014 - Bree Valle, Pool '63, Cuesta College
2013 - Leslie Ferreira, Tina Kronis and Richard Alger, Untitled Warhol Project, Los Angeles City College, Theatre Academy.
2012 - Rich Brown, Us, Western Washington University.

Outstanding Director of a New Work
2014 - Peter Sampieri for Kafka in Tel Aviv, Salem State University
2013 - Maria Eugenia Mercado and Julia Thompson for Platero y Yo by Juan Ramón Jiménez, University of Puerto Rico.
2012 - Beth Turcotte for The Circus in Winter, music and lyrics by Ben Clark, book by the students of the Virginia B. Ball Center for Creative Inquiry, 
inspired by the novel by Cathy Day, Ball State University.

National Award Winners (Acting)

National Award Winners (Choreography) 

Outstanding Choreography or Movement Direction
2014 - Tori Lee Averett for The Single Girl's Guide, Troy University.
2013 - Bob Stevenson with Ian Miller, Phil Whiteaker, Aron Long, Laura Wineland, Stuart Campbell, Ashley Behm, and Joseph Rodriguez-Barberá for Dromnium, University of Arkansas, Fort Smith
2012 - Skye Edwards for Gone Missing, Hope College.

National Award Winners (Design) 

Outstanding Scenic Design
2014 - Mark Evancho, Pentecost, Middlebury College
2013 - Stephen Purdy, Vincent In Brixton, Utah Valley University
2013 - Shannon Meyer, Ghost Bike, Carthage College.
2012 - Christopher and Justin Swader, The Circus in Winter, Ball State University.

Outstanding Sound Design
2013 - L.J. Luthringer, Dromnium, University of Arkansas, Fort Smith.
2012 - Sun Hee Kil, Flipside: The Patti Page Story, University of Central Oklahoma.

Outstanding Costume Design
2014 - Elisa Bierschenk, The Single Girl's Guide, Troy University
2013 - JenNessa Law, Vincent In Brixton, Utah Valley University
2012 - Caroline Spitzer, The House of the Spirits, Florida International University.

Outstanding Lighting Design
2014 - Michael Gray, Next to Normal, Utah Valley University
2014 - Raquel Davis, Three Sisters, Boise State University
2013 - Hannah Yaeger, Dromnium, University of Arkansas, Fort Smith.
2012 - Matt Meldrem, Six Characters, Iowa State University.

National Award Winners (Additional) 

Outstanding Performance by a Guest Artist
2012 - Lindsie Van Winkle as Patti in Flipside: The Patti Page Story, University of Central Oklahoma

Outstanding Achievement in Composition
2013 - Zack Powell for Mother Courage, Illinois State University

Outstanding Performance and Production Ensembles
2013 - Platero y Yo, University of Puerto Rico
2013 - Dromnium, University of Arkansas, Fort Smith

Irene Ryan Scholarship Winners 

A list of the Irene Ryan Scholarship winners, the partners that assisted their wins, and the colleges they represented, spanning from 1972 to 2013:

2013 - Oya Bangura assisted by Bryan Nee, Suffolk County Community College & Ethan Leaverton assisted by Cameron Miller-DeSart, University of Nevada
2012 - Kevin Percivall assisted by Laurel Sein, University of Oklahoma & James Udom assisted by Brian Smick, Diablo Valley College
2011 - Clayton Joyner assisted by Zachary Powell, Illinois State University & Daniel Molina assisted by Kelly Rogers, Savannah College of Art and Design 
2010 - Whitney Morgan Cox assisted by John Dodart, Dixie State University, Utah & Paul Stuart assisted by Colin Ryan, University of Oklahoma 
2009 - Adam Navarro assisted by Courtney Howe, California State University & Meredith Hinckely assisted by Paul Collins California State University 
2008 - Ari Frenkel assisted by Tim Hackney, Montclair State University & Joe Gillette assisted by Peter Weisman, California State University
2007 - Courtney Moors assisted by Michael Cox, University of Central Florida & Chris Crawford assisted by Jenna Kirk, University of Arkansas
2006  - Rory Lipede assisted by Adam Flores, Fontbonne University & Michael Swickard assisted by Margaret-Ellen Jenkins, University of Central Florida
2005  - Amanda Folena, Purdue University & Stephen Laferriere, Salem State College
2004  - Christopher Grant, University of Evansville & Jason Roth, University of Maryland
2003 -  Ruby DesJardins, Suffolk University & Letitia James, Virginia Commonwealth University
2002 - Kelly Bartlett, Iowa State University & Sarah Stockton, University of Portland
2001 - Nancy McNulty, Salem State University & Jason Buuck, California State University  
2000 - Nisi Sturgis, University of Central Arkansas & Ben Steinfeld, Brown University 
1999 - Megan Dillingham, University of Kansas, Lawrence & Rian Jairell, University of Wyoming
1998 - Hattie Davis, Emporia State University, Kansas & Christopher Ross, University of Nebraska-Omaha
1997 - Stephanie Breinholt, Brigham Young University & Esau Pritchett, Oakland University
1996 - Mireille Enos, Brigham Young University & Gabriel Fazio, Suffolk Community College
1995 - Gretchen Cleevely, Miami University of Ohio & Aidan Sullivan, Middlebury College
1994 - Lara Jo Hightower, University of Arkansas, Fayetteville & Kevin P. Rahm, Brigham Young University
1993 - Maria Santucci, Kansas State University, Manhattan & David Bryan Woodside, University of Iowa
1992 - Max Baker, Washington State University, Pullman & Thomas Silcott, Salem State University
1991 - Scott Claflin, Brigham Young University & Heather K. Wilson, University of South Dakota
1990 - Kelly Eviston, Northern Kentucky University & Jeff Lieber, University of Illinois
1989 - Blondale Funderburk, South Carolina State College & Kelly Bertenshaw, University of Minnesota
1988 - Judith Hawking, California Institute of the Arts & Elaine Gallagher, Linfield College
1987 - Melodie Garrett, North Carolina A&T & Brett Rickaby, University of Minnesota
1986 - Kevin Hardesty, University of Kentucky & Tim Gregory, Otterbein College
1985 - David Studwell, Purdue University & Brad Moniz, California State University
1984 - Julia Campbell, Webster College & Gerry McIntyre, Montclair State College
1983 - Don Reilly, College of William & Mary & Jodi Ewen, University of Evansville
1982 - Ron Marasco, Fordham University & Christina Stinson, University of Evansville
1981 - Andrea Huber, Illinois Wesleyan University & Melinda McCrary, Webster College
1980 - Mark Tymchyshyn, Wayne State University & Julia Glander, University of Iowa
1979 - Larry LoVerde, Rhode Island College & Sharon Rolf, University of Evansville
1978 - Saundra Lane Daniel, University of Montevallo & Jeff J. Redford, Cerritos College
1977 - Lynn Topping, Indiana State University & Albert Rodriquez, University of New Mexico
1976 - Rebecca J. Guy, University of Evansville & Kathy Monteleone, Park College
1975 - John M. Doyle, University of Florida & Dan Butler, Indiana University
1974 - Anne Sward, University of Miami & Sheryl L. Ralph, Douglass College, Rutgers University
1973 - Kathleen Couser, North Texas State University & Jeffrey Ware, University of Maryland
1972 - Joyce D. Hanley, Hofstra University & Michael Biers, United States International University

References

External links 
 Kennedy Center American College Theatre Festival Website

Theatre festivals in the United States
University and college theatres in the United States